John Pelham (September 7, 1838 – March 17, 1863) was a soldier who served with the Confederate cavalry under J.E.B. Stuart during the American Civil War. He was called "The Gallant Pelham" by Robert E. Lee for his use of light artillery at Fredericksburg to significantly delay Union soldiers during the Civil War.

Early life

Pelham was the third of seven children, with five brothers and a sister Betty, born to Dr. Atkinson and Martha Pelham (née McGehee ) at his grandparents' home along Cane Creek near Alexandria, Alabama. He grew up on the family's  plantation, and learned to raise horses at a young age.

In 1856, local Congressman Sampson Willis Harris secured an appointment for Pelham to the United States Military Academy at West Point (N.Y.), at the request of A. J. Walker.

Civil War

Already in 1860, rumblings of Southern secession were affecting Pelham, his concerns that he would not be able to graduate expressed in letters he wrote home.

In 1861, with graduation approaching and war breaking out, Pelham wrote to the new leader of the Confederacy, Jefferson Davis, inquiring as to whether he should leave West Point. Ultimately, Pelham resigned from West Point, just a few weeks before his planned graduation, in order to accept a commission in the militia of his home state of Alabama. He soon went to Virginia, where he joined the army of Joseph E. Johnston as a lieutenant in the artillery. Pelham's well-drilled and disciplined battery caught the eye of J.E.B. Stuart, who provided horses for the men and transformed the battery into "horse artillery", more mobile than conventional artillery.

Pelham was involved in every major military engagement of Stuart's cavalry from the First Battle of Bull Run to Kelly's Ford, more than 60 encounters. He is noted as the Chief of Stuart's Artillery in the Battle of Antietam (Sharpsburg) and Battle of Fredericksburg. At Sharpsburg, Pelham's guns, positioned on a rise known as Nicodemus Hill, repeatedly harassed the flanks of oncoming Union lines, causing numerous casualties and breaking up battle formations.

At Fredericksburg, Pelham's guns, positioned well in advance of the main Confederate lines, held up the entire flank of the Union Army of the Potomac for several hours, enabling the Confederates to repel a series of strong attacks. General Robert E. Lee commended Pelham in his official report for "unflinching courage" while under direct fire from multiple Union batteries. Pelham was, at the time, commanding only two guns that were in service, but with those batteries for a time was able to enfilade the entire advancing Federal lines of battle.

At the Battle of Kelly's Ford on March 17, 1863, Pelham participated in a cavalry charge, his artillery not being engaged. Not long afterward, he was struck in the head by a fragment of an exploding Federal artillery shell. He was carried six miles (10 km) from the battlefield to Culpeper Courthouse, and died the following morning without having regained consciousness.

Legacy

The Confederate Senate approved Lee's recommendation that Pelham receive a posthumous promotion to lieutenant colonel. Pelham's body was returned home and buried at City Cemetery in Jacksonville, Alabama where a statue erected downtown in 1909 commemorates the fallen Confederate officer. A stone obelisk monument honoring Pelham, which contained an inscription on the base referring to him as “gallant” and beloved and which had stood in the grassy median of a busy avenue in Anniston, Alabama since 1905, was removed late at night on September 27, 2020. However, there were still plans to relocate it to a Confederate history park.

In 1894, poet James R. Randall wrote the poem John Pelham.

In 1901, a portrait of Pelham was hung with other Confederate officers in Alexandria, Virginia, and General Joseph Wheeler gave the speech on the ascension of his portrait, referring to him as the "Gallant Pelham".

In 1907, one of his spurs was among the artifacts melted down to create the Pokahuntas Bell for the Jamestown Exposition.

The John Pelham Historical Association preserves his archive of papers and memorabilia. In 1955, the Alabama Hall of Fame honored Pelham, inducting him into the honorific organization. The cities of Pelham, Alabama and Pelham, North Carolina, and Pelham, Georgia are named in his honor. In 2004, against protests by some citizens, the state of Georgia designated the section of State Highway 300 that passes through Pelham as the John Pelham Memorial Parkway.

The United States Field Artillery named artillery camps for him, such as the former Camp Pelham which housed artillery battalions of first the 1st Cavalry Division and then later the 2nd Infantry Division in Korea.

In the 1970s, The County of Culpeper, Virginia, built Lake Pelham to honor the rebel soldier.

During and after the Civil War Pelham's 1858 photograph, taken in the Mathew Brady studio, was well known by white Southerners still honoring the purposes of the Confederacy. While many copies were made, the original was long thought lost. It was held by Pelham's sister, Betty, and kept by her descendants at home in a fireproof safe. In 2010 Pelham's great-great grand-nephew consigned the piece for auction. It sold for $41,825.

In March 2013 the city of Jacksonville, Alabama celebrated Pelham with a weekend of living history campsites and a sesquicentennial recreation of Pelham's funeral procession to City Cemetery.

See also

Notes

References
 Brewer, Wilson. Alabama, Her History, Resources, War Record, and Public Men: From 1540 to 1872. Montgomery, AL: Barrett & Brown, 1872. .
 Hassler, William W. Colonel John Pelham: Lee's Boy Artillerist. Chapel Hill: University of North Carolina Press, 1995. .
 Thomas, Emory M. Bold Dragoon: The Life of J.E.B. Stuart. Norman: University of Oklahoma Press, 1986. .
 U.S. War Department. The War of the Rebellion: A Compilation of the Official Records of the Union and Confederate Armies. Washington, D.C.: U.S. Government Printing Office, 1880–1901.

Further reading
 Maxwell, Jerry H. The Perfect Lion: The Life and Death of Confederate Artillerist John Pelham. Tuscaloosa: University of Alabama Press, 2011. .
 Matteson, John, A Worse Place Than Hell: How the Civil War Battle of Fredericksburg Changed a Nation. New York: W.W. Norton and Company, 2021. .

External links

 Alabama Hall of Fame
 John Pelham Historical Association
 

1838 births
1863 deaths
Confederate States Army officers
Confederate States of America military personnel killed in the American Civil War
People from Calhoun County, Alabama
People of Virginia in the American Civil War
United States Military Academy alumni